Oreocnemis is a monotypic genus of damselfly in the family Platycnemididae. It contains only Oreocnemis phoenix.

O. phoenix is endemic to the plateau of Mulanje, Malawi. It was discovered by Philip Mhlanga in December 1970. The generic name comes from the Greek oros, meaning mountain, and the specific from the male's bright-red coloration.

Sources

Platycnemididae
Monotypic Odonata genera
Zygoptera genera
Taxonomy articles created by Polbot